Didy Veldman (born 1967, Groningen) is a Dutch choreographer. She trained at the Scapino Academy in Amsterdam. She has danced with Scapino Ballet, Ballet du Grand Théâtre de Genève and Rambert Dance Company, working with international choreographers such as Jiri Kylian, Mats Ek, Ohad Naharin and Christopher Bruce, among others.

In 1993, Veldman founded Alias Company with Guilherme Botelho. Their creation En Manqué won two major choreographic awards, the Dance Exchange International and the Prix Romand des Spectacle Independent.  The following year, she was invited to join Rambert Dance Company and created three works for their repertoire.  She has created and re-staged works for Les Grands Ballets Canadiens de Montreal, Ballet Gulbenkian, Cullberg Ballet, Northern Ballet Theatre, The Royal New Zealand Ballet, the Komische Oper Berlin, Scottish Dance Theatre, Cedar Lake Contemporary Ballet, amongst others.

Creations
 1987 - Sem Titulo - Scapino Ballet
 1988 - Kleur Bekennen - Scapino Ballet
 1991 - Close - Le Grands Theatre de Geneve
 1993 - 40 Watt - Le Grands Theatre de Geneve
 1994 - En Manqué - Alias Company
 1995 - Kol Simcha - Rambert Dance Company
 1997 - Greymatter - Rambert Dance Company
 1998 - Somna - Ballet Central
 1999 - Carmen - Northern Ballet Theatre
 2000 - 7 DS - Rambert Dance Company
 2001 - A Streetcar Named Desire - Northern Ballet Theatre
 2001 - See Blue Through - Ballet Gulbenkian
 2001 - Chase Case - Eurovision Young Dancer of the Year
 2002 - I Remember Red - Cullberg Ballet
 2002 - Possibly Six - Les Grands Ballets Canadiens de Montreal
 2003 - '0' (She Who Was) - Komische Oper Berlin
 2003 - Tender Hooks - Ballet Gulbenkian
 2004 - Outsight - Ballet Gulbenkian
 2004 - Track - Scottish Dance Theatre
 2005 - TooT - Les Grands Ballets Canadiens de Montreal
 2006 - Sweet & Sour - Iceland Dance Company
 2007 - Cinderella - Goteborg Ballet Sweden
 2007 - Stop and Go and Yes and No - Introdans, Holland
 2007 - Peter & the Wolf - In the Wings
 2008 - Frame of View - Cederlake, New York, USA
 2009 - Session - Introdans, Holland
 2010 - Momo - Ballet Bern, Switzerland
 2011 - Language Matters - Ballet Mainz
 2011 - Kind of a Sort - Northwest Dance Project, Portland, USA
 2012 - new work - students of the Modern Theatre Dance Academy in Amsterdam, Holland
 2012 - Les Noces - Le Grand Théâtre de Genève
 2012 - The Little Prince - Les Grands Ballets, Montréal
 2012 - In the Skin I'm in 1, 2 & 3 - Headspace, UK
 2013 - Tristan & Isolde - Longborough Festival, UK
 2014 - The 3 Dancers - Rambert Dance Company, UK
 2014 - new work - students of the London Contemporary Dance School, UK
 2016 - The Happiness Project - Umanoove/Didy Veldman
 2016 - 360° - Luzerner Theater, Switzerland
 2016 - new work - graduate students London Contemporary Dance School
 2017 - new work - graduate students Rambert School
 2018 - The Knot - Umanoove/Didy Veldman
 2019 - new work - Transitions Dance Company
 2019 - Is to Be - The Partner Schools of the Prix de Lausanne
 2019 - a.part - Map Dance, Chichester University
 2019 - Sense of Time - Birmingham Royal Ballet
 2019 - Made in Holland - National Ballet School, Amsterdam
 2020 - Carmen - Natalia Osipova
 2020 - @HOME - Humanoove

Awards
 1987 - Encouragement Perspective Prize for Sem Titulo

References

1967 births
Living people
Dutch women choreographers
Dutch ballerinas
People from Groningen (city)
20th-century Dutch ballet dancers
21st-century ballet dancers